The Bronze Age in the Indian subcontinent begins around 3000 BCE, and in the end gives rise to the Indus Valley Civilisation, which had its (mature) period between 2600 BCE and 1900 BCE. It continues into the Rigvedic period, the early part of the Vedic period. It is succeeded by the  Iron Age in India, beginning in around 1000 BCE.

South India, by contrast, remains in the Mesolithic stage until about 2500 BCE. 
In the 2nd millennium BCE, there may have been cultural contact between North and South India, even though South India skips a Bronze Age proper and enters the Iron Age from the Chalcolithic stage directly. In February 2006, a school teacher in the village of Sembian-Kandiyur in Tamil Nadu discovered a stone celt with an inscription estimated to be up to 3,500 years old.
 Indian epigraphist Iravatham Mahadevan postulated that the writing was in Indus script and called the find "the greatest archaeological discovery of a century in Tamil Nadu".

World timeline

See also
 Periodisation of the Indus Valley civilisation
 Iron Age in India
 Indus Valley Civilisation
 Indus script

References

Literature 
 
 

Prehistoric India
India